Kathrin Anders (born 3 May 1982 in Bad Vilbel) is a German politician (Alliance 90/The Greens) and since 2019 member of the Landtag of Hesse.

Life 
Anders trained as an educator and studied social pedagogy at the Frankfurt University of Applied Sciences. Since 2014, she has been a teacher at an elementary school. Anders is divorced and the mother of three children.

Politics 
Anders is a member of the Bad Vilbel City Council, and as a parliamentary group leader, for her party.
In the 2013 Hessian state election, she ran in the Wetterau I constituency, but was not elected to parliament with 10.3% of the primary vote.
In the 2018 Hessian state election, she did not run as a direct candidate, but entered the state parliament via her party's list.

References

External links 
 The Hessian State Parliament
 Website von Kathrin Anders
 Hessisches Statistisches Landesamt: Statistische Berichte. Die Landtagswahl in Hessen am 28. Oktober 2018. Vorläufige Ergebnisse, S. 20

1982 births
Living people
Alliance 90/The Greens politicians
Members of the Landtag of Hesse
21st-century German politicians
21st-century German women politicians